A rota is an infantry or cavalry unit. In Poland it was known increasingly from the 16th century by the alternative name of Chorągiew.

After about 1630, the term was used to describe a file of 6-10 soldiers in formations (especially infantry) in the Polish army raised on the Foreign model.

This term is used in the Bulgarian Army, the Czech Army, the Slovak Army, and the Russian Army and means company.

See also
 Choragiew
 Poczet
 Kopia

Military history of Poland
Polish–Lithuanian Commonwealth

eo:Roto
de:Rotte
ru:Рота (армия)
pl:Rota (oddział)